The Seychelles Hockey Federation (SHF) is the governing body of field hockey in Seychelles. Its headquarters are in Mahe, Seychelles. It is affiliated to IHF International Hockey Federation and AHF African Hockey Federation.

George Sicobo is the president of Hockey Association of Seychelles and Jeffrey Lagrenade is the General Secretary.

History

See also
 Seychelles Hockey Festival-2014
African Hockey Federation

References

External links
Seychelles Hockey-FB

Seychelles
Hockey